James Clement McAndrew (born January 11, 1944, in Lost Nation, Iowa) is a Major League Baseball pitcher from  to ; he pitched for the New York Mets for his first six years, and the San Diego Padres in the last.

McAndrew started twelve games for the Mets in 1968; the Mets had a 4–8 record in those games, and his record was 4–7. He had a low 2.28 ERA in 1968.

He pitched in 161 games in his career, starting 110 of them. His W–L record was 37–53, with a 3.65 ERA; almost exactly the league average in those years. His nickname during his playing days was, "The Pride of Lost Nation, Iowa".

References

External links

Jim McAndrew at Society for American Baseball Research

Living people
1944 births
Baseball players from Iowa
Major League Baseball pitchers
New York Mets players
San Diego Padres players
Iowa Hawkeyes baseball players
Auburn Mets players
Marion Mets players
Williamsport Mets players
Jacksonville Suns players
Iowa Oaks players
People from Lost Nation, Iowa